The women's 4 × 400 metres relay at the 2013 Asian Athletics Championships was held at the Shiv Chhatrapati Stadium on 7 July.

Note:

References

400 Women's Relay
Relays at the Asian Athletics Championships
2013 in women's athletics